Survivor: Ghost Island is the 36th season of the American CBS competitive reality television series Survivor. Ghost Island was filmed in the summer of 2017 and premiered on February 28, 2018, on CBS with a two-hour episode. The season concluded on May 23, 2018. This season was the fifth to be filmed in Fiji, surpassing Nicaragua, the Philippines and Samoa for the highest number of Survivor seasons filmed in a single country.

This season marks the first time in Survivor history in which two players were tied for having the most jury votes at the Final Tribal Council. Domenick Abbate and Wendell Holland each received five votes from the jury, while Laurel Johnson received none. In order to break the tie, Johnson joined the jury and used her deciding vote to award the title of Sole Survivor to Holland.

Ghost Island
This season introduced Ghost Island, a secluded location similar to Exile Island, where castaways were banished for short periods. The island was decorated with mementos and props from previous seasons of Survivor, including torch snuffers and immunity idols.

With few exceptions, castaways were exiled to Ghost Island after being chosen by the winners of the reward challenge. The challenge winners were required to unanimously choose a losing castaway; if they were unable to do so, the losing castaways would draw colored rocks to determine who would be exiled. On Ghost Island, exiled castaways were instructed to smash the next in a series of urns, some of which would allow the castaway to compete in a game of chance for an advantage in the game. The advantages were taken from previous seasons of Survivor, all of which were misplayed in their original seasons. Exiled castaways were given the opportunity to acquire these advantages under the premise of learning from past castaways' mistakes.

The game of chance would require the castaway to wager their vote at their next Tribal Council in order to play. In initial games, castaways were presented with two bamboo shoots, of which one contained an advantage while the other would cost them their vote; for each lost or unplayed game, subsequent games would add another shoot with an advantage, increasing subsequent castaways' odds at winning. 

Extending the theme of using misplayed advantages from previous seasons, the hidden immunity idols this season were misplayed items from previous seasons.

Contestants

Future appearances
Wendell Holland returned to compete on Survivor: Winners at War.

Outside of Survivor, Holland competed on the discovery+ special Beach Cabana Royale. In 2022, Domenick Abbate competed on The Challenge: USA.

Season summary
The 20 castaways were divided into two tribes: Malolo and Naviti. Naviti fared better in challenges but was divided by a conflict between Domenick and Chris. Through two tribe shuffles, Naviti held the majority on every tribe; some, such as Kellyn, held strong to eliminate original Malolos, while others, like Domenick and his closest ally Wendell, worked to consolidate power at the merge, forming an alliance with original Malolos Donathan and Laurel.

At the merge, Domenick led the tribe in eliminating Chris before the majority began picking off the remaining original Malolos. However, they began to turn on the female Naviti alliance members, sending Chelsea and Kellyn home when the two led a charge to turn on Domenick and Wendell. Both Domenick and Wendell had hidden immunity idols; Donathan later turned against them to try and flush their idols, but he was unable to rally enough votes against them and was eliminated.

The final four were Domenick, Laurel, Wendell and outsider Angela. Domenick won the final immunity challenge and turned on Wendell as the biggest remaining threat. He decided to bring Laurel to the end of the game, leaving Angela to face Wendell in the fire-making challenge to determine the third finalist, which Wendell won. At the final Tribal Council, the jury debated between Domenick’s more aggressive strategic game and Wendell’s more relaxed social game, and the ten jurors tied the vote, with five votes each on Domenick and Wendell. Laurel, as the third-place finalist with zero votes, cast the tie-breaking vote for Wendell, crowning him the Sole Survivor.

Episodes

Voting history

Notes

Reception
Survivor: Ghost Island was met with a mixed to negative reception by fans and critics. Though the gameplay of Wendell and Domenick, as well as the pre-merge portion of the season, were praised, the incoherence and predictability of the edit after the merge was its most criticized aspect. Many castaways who made it far in the game were poorly portrayed, with the viewers being left in the dark about several of their strategies due to the edit's constant focus on a specific group of players, who also happened to be the final three. Austin Smith of fan site "Inside Survivor" gave the season a mixed review, saying the season "delivered a stellar pre-merge full of exciting moves and memorable characters. It gave us one of the best merge episodes of all time. It sagged under the weight of predictable boots and frustrating intransigence through the later votes, but it was still punctuated by exciting new twists like the split Tribal at Final Ten. And it gave us one of the most unexpected finales of all time." Andy Dehnart of Reality Blurred criticized the season's post-merge episodes and the finale, saying "The finale ended up like the majority of the post-merge: grand promises, no action, rinse, repeat, zzzz." People Magazine blogger Stephen Fishbach, who played in Survivor: Tocantins and Survivor: Cambodia, praised the dominant gameplay of Domenick Abbate and winner Wendell Holland, but also stated that their gameplay made for "boring television." Dalton Ross of Entertainment Weekly ranked this season 19th praising the ending but believing that the Ghost Island concept was underdeveloped. In 2020, Survivor fan site "Purple Rock Podcast" ranked this season 30th saying that "while it is interesting to watch [Survivors first finale tie vote] play out, it can't lift this season out of the lower tiers". Later that same year, Inside Survivor ranked this season 32nd out of 40 saying that "it has a strong premiere, an excellent merge episode, and an entertaining finale with a gloriously dramatic conclusion. But a season can not stand on three episodes alone." In 2021, Rob Has a Podcast ranked Ghost Island 32nd during their Survivor All-Time Top 40 Rankings podcast.

References

External links
 Official CBS Survivor Website
 Metacritic
 IMDB

2017 in Fiji
2018 American television seasons
36
Television shows filmed in Fiji
Television shows set in Fiji